Karolos or Károlos is a Greek masculine given name that is an alternate form of Karl.  Notable people referred to by this name include the following:

Given name
Karolos Koun (1908–1987) Greek theater director
Karolos Papoulias (1929–2021), Greek politician
Karolos Trikolidis, Austrian conductor

See also

Karlos (name)
Karolis
Karolów (disambiguation)

Notes

Greek masculine given names